Jérôme Porical (born 20 September 1985 in Perpignan) is a professional rugby union fullback currently playing for Béziers in the French Pro D2.  He has previously played for Stade Français, Lyon in the Top 14, but started his career with home-town club Perpignan, where both his grandfather Paul and his father Gérald played, Paul reaching three French Championship finals and winning one in 1938, and Gérald losing the 1977 final. In the 2008–09 Top 14 season, Jérôme reached the final of the Top 14, again with Perpignan, and greatly contributed to his side's 22–13 victory over Clermont, managing a perfect 5 out of 5 in his kicking attempts.

Honours
USA Perpignan
Top 14 (2009)

References

French rugby union players
AS Béziers Hérault players
USA Perpignan players
Sportspeople from Perpignan
1985 births
Living people
France international rugby union players
Stade Français players
Lyon OU players
Rugby union fullbacks